Showkat Ali Tahir (born 3 May 2001) is an English professional footballer who plays as a forward. He is a product of the Brentford and Fulham academies and began his senior career with Chesham United in non-League football.

Career

Early years 
As a forward, Tahir began his youth career in the Brentford and Fulham academies and progressed with the latter club to sign a two-year scholarship deal in July 2017. After his release by Fulham at the end of the 2019–20 season, he dropped into non-League football to join Isthmian League Premier Division club Cheshunt in December 2019, for whom he was an unused substitute on one occasion during the remainder of the 2019–20 season. Tahir moved to join Southern League Premier Division Central club Chesham United in August 2021 and made four appearances and scored one goal prior to his departure midway through the 2021–22 season.

North Carolina FC 
On 7 December 2021, it was announced that Tahir had signed one-year contract with USL League One club North Carolina FC. He made 20 appearances and scored two goals during a 2022 season which culminated in a bottom place finish.

Career statistics

References

External links 
 Showkat Tahir at northcarolinafc.com

2001 births
Living people
English footballers
Black British sportspeople
Footballers from Greater London
Chesham United F.C. players
Southern Football League players
Association football forwards
North Carolina FC players
USL League One players
English expatriate footballers
Expatriate soccer players in the United States
English expatriate sportspeople in the United States